Michael Jay Fuentes (born July 11, 1958) is an American former Major League Baseball player. He attended Florida State University, where he was the 1981 recipient of the Golden Spikes Award.

Career
Fuentes was selected by the Montreal Expos with their second-round pick in the 1981 Major League Baseball draft. Fuentes was 25 years old when he broke into the big leagues on September 2, 1983, with the Expos. He played in a total of nine games in the majors, eight as a pinch hitter or pinch runner and one in left field. He went 2-for-8 at the plate, with no extra base hits or RBI.

References

External links

Mike Fuentes page at Baseball Almanac

1958 births
Living people
All-American college baseball players
American expatriate baseball players in Canada
Baseball players from Miami
Columbus Astros players
Florida State Seminoles baseball players
Indianapolis Indians players
Major League Baseball left fielders
Memphis Chicks players
Montreal Expos players
Tucson Toros players
West Palm Beach Expos players
Wichita Aeros players
Alaska Goldpanners of Fairbanks players
Coral Gables Senior High School alumni